Crowder Construction Company is a privately owned General Contracting, and Design-Build service provider. Founded in 1947 by O. P. and W.T. Crowder, Crowder Construction Company is headquartered in Charlotte, North Carolina.

Crowder is ranked among the top 400 contractors by Engineering News-Record.

History
In 1947, brothers O. P. and W.T. Crowder completed their first project, a church sidewalk. In less than a decade, they developed a team of 40 employees to undertake Crowder's first major highway construction project, a bridge in Charlotte, NC. As the Company grew, O. P. and W.T. moved to larger heavy civil and environmental projects including water and wastewater treatment plants. Crowder expanded its operations in the early 1990s to include mechanical and industrial projects. Crowder opened offices in Apex, North Carolina and Spartanburg, South Carolina, creating two new divisions of operation.

Company executives include Otis Crowder, son of O.P. Crowder, as chief executive officer and Bill Crowder Jr., son of W.T. Crowder, as chief operating officer.

Divisions

Civil & Environmental

Located in Apex, North Carolina focuses on Wastewaster Treatment Plants, Water Treatment Plants, Pump Stations and Electrical Projects. Regional Offices located in Roswell, Georgia, Midlothian, Virginia, and Franklin, Tennessee.

Heavy Civil

Located in Charlotte, NC focuses on Bridges, Dams, Pedestrian Trails, Tunnels, Pile Driving, Shoring, and Deep Excavations.

Industrial

Located in Spartanburg, SC focuses on Power Stations and Metal Fabrication.

Energy Services

Located in Apex, NC focuses on Renewable Energy Solutions.

Charitable Contributions 
Otis Crowder, owner of Crowder Construction Company, is a frequent donor to nonprofit housing causes, including Heal Charlotte.

References

External links
Crowder Construction Company homepage

Companies based in Charlotte, North Carolina
Construction and civil engineering companies established in 1947
Privately held companies based in North Carolina
Construction and civil engineering companies of the United States
1947 establishments in North Carolina